Zambia, officially the Republic of Zambia, is a landlocked country at the crossroads of Central, Southern and East Africa, although it is typically referred to as being in Southern Africa at its most central point. Its neighbours are the Democratic Republic of the Congo to the north, Tanzania to the northeast, Malawi to the east, Mozambique to the southeast, Zimbabwe and Botswana to the south, Namibia to the southwest, and Angola to the west. The capital city of Zambia is Lusaka, located in the south-central part of Zambia. The nation's population of around 20.1 million (2023) is concentrated mainly around Lusaka in the south and the Copperbelt Province to the north, the core economic hubs of the country.

Originally inhabited by Khoisan peoples, the region was affected by the Bantu expansion of the thirteenth century. Following the arrival of European explorers in the eighteenth century, the British colonised the region into the British protectorates of Barotseland-North-Western Rhodesia and North-Eastern Rhodesia comprising 73 tribes, towards the end of the nineteenth century. These were merged in 1911 to form Northern Rhodesia. For most of the colonial period, Zambia was governed by an administration appointed from London with the advice of the British South Africa Company.

On 24 October 1964, Zambia became independent of the United Kingdom and prime minister Kenneth Kaunda became the inaugural president. Kaunda's socialist United National Independence Party (UNIP) maintained power from 1964 until 1991. Kaunda played a key role in regional diplomacy, cooperating closely with the United States in search of solutions to conflicts in Southern Rhodesia (Zimbabwe), Angola, and Namibia. From 1972 to 1991 Zambia was a one-party state with UNIP as the sole legal political party under the motto "One Zambia, One Nation" coined by Kaunda. Kaunda was succeeded by Frederick Chiluba of the social-democratic Movement for Multi-Party Democracy in 1991, beginning a period of socio-economic development and government decentralisation. Zambia has since become a multi-party state and has experienced several peaceful transitions of power.

Zambia contains abundant natural resources, including minerals, wildlife, forestry, freshwater and arable land. In 2010, the World Bank named Zambia one of the world's fastest economically reformed countries. The Common Market for Eastern and Southern Africa (COMESA) is headquartered in Lusaka.

Etymology

The territory of Zambia was known as Northern Rhodesia from 1911 to 1964. It was renamed Zambia in October 1964 on its independence from British rule. The name Zambia derives from the Zambezi River (Zambezi may mean "grand river").

History

Prehistoric era
Archaeological excavation work on the Zambezi Valley and Kalambo Falls shows a succession of human cultures. Ancient camp site tools near the Kalambo Falls have been radiocarbon dated to more than 36,000 years ago.

The fossil skull remains of Broken Hill Man (also known as Kabwe Man), dated between 300,000 and 125,000 years BC, further shows that the area was inhabited by early humans. Broken Hill Man was discovered in Zambia in Kabwe District.

Khoisan and Batwa 

Modern Zambia once was inhabited by the Khoisan and Batwa peoples until around AD 300, when migrating Bantu began to settle the areas. It is believed the Khoisan people originated in East Africa and spread southwards around 150,000 years ago. The Twa people were split into two groups: the Kafwe Twa lived around the Kafue Flats and the Lukanga Twa who lived around the Lukanga Swamp. Many examples of ancient rock art in Zambia, like the Mwela Rock Paintings, Mumbwa Caves, and Nachikufu Cave, are attributed to these early hunter-gatherers. The Khoisan and especially the Twa formed a patron-client relationship with farming Bantu peoples across central and southern Africa but were eventually either displaced by or absorbed into the Bantu groups.

The Bantu (Abantu)
The Bantu people or Abantu (meaning people) are an enormous and diverse ethnolinguistic group that constitutes the majority of people in much of eastern, southern and central Africa.  Because of Zambia's location at the crossroads of Central Africa, Southern Africa, and the African Great Lakes, the history of the people that constitute modern Zambians is a history of these three regions.

Many of the historical events in these three regions happened simultaneously, and thus Zambia's history, like many African nations', cannot be presented perfectly chronologically. The early history of the peoples of modern Zambia is deduced from oral records, archaeology, and written records, mostly from non-Africans.

Bantu origins

The Bantu people originally lived in West and Central Africa around what is today Cameroon and Nigeria. Around 4000 to 3000 years ago they began a millennia-long expansion into much of the continent. This event has been called the Bantu expansion; it was one of the largest human migrations in history. The Bantu are believed to have been the first to have brought iron working technology into large parts of Africa. The Bantu Expansion happened primarily through two routes: a western one via the Congo Basin and an eastern one via the African Great Lakes.

First Bantu settlement
The first Bantu people to arrive in Zambia came through the eastern route via the African Great Lakes. They arrived around the first millennium A.D., and among them were the Tonga people (also called Ba-Tonga, "Ba-" meaning "many") and the Ba-Ila and Namwanga and other related groups, who settled around Southern Zambia near Zimbabwe. Ba-Tonga oral records indicate that they came from the east near the "big sea".

They were later joined by the Ba-Tumbuka who settled around Eastern Zambia and Malawi.

These first Bantu people lived in large villages. They lacked an organised unit under a chief or headman and worked as a community and helped each other in times of field preparation for their crops. Villages moved around frequently as the soil became exhausted as a result of the slash-and-burn technique of planting crops. The people also kept large herds of cattle, which formed an important part of their societies.

The first Bantu communities in Zambia were highly self-sufficient. Early European missionaries who settled in Wl southern Zambia noted the independence of these Bantu societies. One of these missionaries noted:
"[If] weapons for war, hunting, and domestic purposes are needed, the Tonga man goes to the hills and digs until he finds the iron ore. He smelts it and with the iron thus obtained makes axes, hoes, and other useful implements. He burns wood and makes charcoal for his forge. His bellows are made from the skins of animals and the pipes are clay tile, and the anvil and hammers are also pieces of the iron he has obtained. He moulds, welds, shapes, and performs all the work of the ordinary blacksmith."

These early Bantu settlers also participated in the trade at the site Ingombe Ilede (which translates to sleeping cow in Chi-Tonga because the fallen baobab tree appears to resembles a cow) in Southern Zambia. At this trading site they met numerous Kalanga/Shona traders from Great Zimbabwe and Swahili traders from the East African Swahili coast. Ingombe Ilede was one of the most important trading posts for rulers of Great Zimbabwe, others being the Swahili port cities like Sofala.

The goods traded at Ingombe Ilede included fabrics, beads, gold, and bangles. Some of these items came from what is today southern Democratic Republic of Congo and Kilwa Kisiwani while others came from as far away as India, China and the Arab world. The African traders were later joined by the Portuguese in the 16th century.

The decline of Great Zimbabwe, due to increasing trade competition from other Kalanga/Shona kingdoms like Khami and Mutapa, spelt the end of Ingombe Ilede.

Second Bantu settlement
The second mass settlement of Bantu people into Zambia was of people groups that are believed to have taken the western route of the Bantu migration through the Congo Basin. These Bantu people spent the majority of their existence in what is today the Democratic Republic of Congo and are ancestors of the majority of modern Zambians.

While there is some evidence that the Bemba people or AbaBemba have a strong ancient connection to the Kongo Kingdom through BaKongo ruler Mwene Kongo VIII Mvemba, this is not well documented.

Luba-Lunda states

The Bemba, along with other related groups like the Lamba, Bisa, Senga, Kaonde, Swaka, Nkoya and Soli, formed integral parts of the Luba Kingdom in Upemba part of the Democratic Republic of Congo and have a strong relation to the BaLuba people. The area which the Luba Kingdom occupied has been inhabited by early farmers and iron workers since the 300s.

Over time these communities learned to use nets and harpoons, make dugout canoes, clear canals through swamps and make dams as high as 2.5 meters. As a result, they grew a diverse economy trading fish, copper and iron items and salt for goods from other parts of Africa, like the Swahili coast and, later on, the Portuguese. From these communities arose the Luba Kingdom in the 14th century.

The Luba Kingdom was a large kingdom with a centralised government and smaller independent chiefdoms. It had large trading networks that linked the forests in the Congo Basin and the mineral-rich plateaus of what is today Copperbelt Province and stretched from the Atlantic coast to the Indian Ocean coast. The arts were also held in high esteem in the kingdom, and artisans were held in high regard.

Literature was well developed in the Luba Kingdom. One renowned Luba genesis story that articulated the distinction between two types of Luba emperors goes as follows:

In the same region of Southern Congo the Lunda people were made into a satellite of the Luba empire and adopted forms of Luba culture and governance, thus becoming the Lunda Empire to the south. According to Lunda genesis myths, a Luba hunter named Chibinda Ilunga, son of Ilunga Mbidi Kiluwe, introduced the Luba model of statecraft to the Lunda sometime around 1600 when he married a local Lunda princess named Lueji and was granted control of her kingdom. Most rulers who claimed descent from Luba ancestors were integrated into the Luba empire. The Lunda kings, however, remained separate and actively expanded their political and economic dominance over the region.

The Lunda, like its parent state Luba, also traded with both coasts, the Atlantic and Indian Oceans. While ruler Mwaant Yaav Naweej had established trade routes to the Atlantic coast and initiated direct contact with European traders eager for slaves and forest products and controlling the regional Copper trade, and settlements around Lake Mweru regulated commerce with the East African coast.

The Luba-Lunda states eventually declined as a result of both Atlantic slave trade in the west and Indian Ocean slave trade in the east and wars with breakaway factions of the kingdoms. The Chokwe, a group that is closely related to the Luvale and formed a Lunda satellite state, initially suffered from the European demand for slaves, but once they broke away from the Lunda state, they themselves became notorious slave traders, exporting slaves to both coasts.

The Chokwe eventually were defeated by the other ethnic groups and the Portuguese. This instability caused the collapse of the Luba-Lunda states and a dispersal of people into various parts of Zambia from the Democratic Republic of the Congo. The majority of Zambians trace their ancestry to the Luba-Lunda and surrounding Central African states.

The Maravi Confederacy
In the 1200s, before the founding of the Luba-Lunda states, a group of Bantu people started migrating from the Congo Basin to Lake Mweru then finally settled around Lake Malawi. These migrants are believed to have been one of the inhabitants around the Upemba area in the Democratic Republic of Congo. By the 1400s these groups of migrants collectively called the Maravi, and most prominently among them was the Chewa people (AChewa), who started assimilating other Bantu groups like the Tumbuka.

In 1480 the Maravi Empire was founded by the kalonga (paramount chief of the Maravi) from the Phiri clan, one of the main clans, with the others being Banda, Mwale and Nkhoma. The Maravi Empire stretched from the Indian Ocean through what today is Mozambique to Zambia and large parts of Malawi. The political organization of the Maravi resembled that of the Luba and is believed to have originated from there. The primary export of the Maravi was ivory, which was transported to Swahili brokers.

Iron was also manufactured and exported. In the 1590s the Portuguese endeavoured to monopolize Maravi export trade. This attempt was met with outrage by the Maravi of Lundu, who unleashed their WaZimba armed force. The WaZimba sacked the Portuguese trade towns of Tete, Sena and various other towns.

The Maravi are also believed to have brought the traditions that would become Nyau secret society from Upemba. The Nyau form the cosmology or indigenous religion of the people of Maravi. The Nyau society consists of ritual dance performances and masks used for the dances; this belief system spread around the region.

The Maravi declined as a result of succession disputes within the confederacy, attack by the Ngoni and slave raids from the Yao.

Mutapa Empire and Mfecane

As Great Zimbabwe was in decline, one of its princes, Nyatsimba Mutota, broke away from the state forming a new empire called Mutapa. The title of Mwene Mutapa, meaning "Ravager of the Lands", was bestowed on him and subsequent rulers.

The Mutapa Empire ruled territory between the Zambezi and Limpopo rivers, in what is now Zambia, Zimbabwe, and Mozambique, from the 14th to the 17th century. By its peak Mutapa had conquered the Dande area of the Tonga and Tavara. The Mutapa Empire predominately engaged in the Indian Ocean transcontinental trade with and via the WaSwahili. They primarily exported gold and ivory in exchange for silk and ceramics from Asia.

Like their contemporaries in Maravi, Mutapa had problems with the arriving Portuguese traders. The peak of this uneasy relationship was reached when the Portuguese attempted to influence the kingdom's internal affairs by establishing markets in the kingdom and converting the population to Christianity. This action caused outrage from the Muslim WaSwahili living in the capital, and this chaos gave the Portuguese the excuse they were searching for to warrant an attack on the kingdom and try to control its gold mines and ivory routes. This attack failed when the Portuguese succumbed to disease along the Zambezi river.

In the 1600s internal disputes and civil war began the decline of Mutapa. The weakened kingdom was finally conquered by the Portuguese and was eventually taken over by rival Shona states.

The Portuguese also had vast estates, known as Prazos, and they used slaves and ex-slaves as security guards and hunters. They trained the men in military tactics and gave them guns. These men became expert elephant hunters and were known as the Chikunda. After the decline of the Portuguese the Chikunda made their way to Zambia. 

It is hypothesised by Julian Cobbing that the presence of early Europeans slave trading and attempts to control resources in various parts of Bantu Speaking Africa caused the gradual militarization of the people in the region. This can be observed with the Maravi's WaZimba warrior caste, who, once defeating the Portuguese, remained quite militaristic afterwards.

The Portuguese presence in the region was also a major reason for the founding of the Rozvi Empire, a breakaway state of Mutapa. The ruler of the Rozvi, Changamire Dombo, became one of the most powerful leaders in South-Central Africa's history. Under his leadership, the Rozvi defeated the Portuguese and expelled them from their trading posts along the Zambezi river.

But perhaps the most notable instance of this increased militarization was the rise of the Zulu under the leadership of Shaka. Pressures from the English colonialists in the Cape and increased militarization of the Zulu resulted in the Mfecane (the crushing). The Zulu expanded by assimilating the women and children of tribes they defeated; if the men of these Nguni tribes escaped slaughter, they used the military tactics of the Zulu to attack other groups.

This caused mass displacements, wars and raids throughout Southern, Central and Eastern Africa as Nguni or Ngoni tribes made their way throughout the region and is referred to as the Mfecane. The arriving Nguni under the leadership of Zwagendaba crossed the Zambezi river moving northwards. The Ngoni were the final blow to the already weakened Maravi Empire. Many Nguni eventually settled around what is today Zambia, Malawi, Mozambique and Tanzania, and assimilated into neighbouring tribes.

In the western part of Zambia, another Southern African group of Sotho-Tswana heritage called the Kololo managed to conquer the local inhabitants who were migrants from the fallen Luba and Lunda states called the Luyana or Aluyi. The Luyana established the Barotse Kingdom on the floodplains of the Zambezi upon their arrival from Katanga. Under the Kololo, the Kololo language was imposed upon the Luyana until the Luyana revolted and overthrew the Kololo; by this time the Luyana language was largely forgotten and a new hybrid language emerged, SiLozi, and the Luyana began to refer to themselves as Lozi.

At the end of the 18th century, some of the Mbunda migrated to Barotseland, Mongu upon the migration of among others, the Ciyengele. The Aluyi and their leader, the Litunga Mulambwa, especially valued the Mbunda for their fighting ability.

By the late 19th century, most of the various peoples of Zambia were established in their current areas.

Colonial Period

Europeans

One of the earliest recorded Europeans to visit the area was the Portuguese explorer Francisco de Lacerda in the late 18th century. Lacerda led an expedition from Mozambique to the Kazembe region in Zambia (with the goal of exploring and to crossing Southern Africa from coast to coast for the first time), and died during the expedition in 1798. The expedition was from then on led by his friend Francisco Pinto. This territory, located between Portuguese Mozambique and Portuguese Angola, was claimed and explored by Portugal in that period.

Other European visitors followed in the 19th century. The most prominent of these was David Livingstone, who had a vision of ending the slave trade through the "3 Cs": Christianity, Commerce, and Civilisation. He was the first European to see the magnificent waterfalls on the Zambezi River in 1855, naming them the Victoria Falls after Queen Victoria of the United Kingdom. He described them thus: "Scenes so lovely must have been gazed upon by angels in their flight".

Locally the falls are known as "Mosi-o-Tunya" or "thundering smoke" in the Lozi or Kololo dialect. The town of Livingstone, near the Falls, is named after him. Highly publicised accounts of his journeys motivated a wave of European visitors, missionaries and traders after his death in 1873.

British South Africa Company

In 1888, the British South Africa Company (BSA Company), led by Cecil Rhodes, obtained mineral rights from the Litunga of the Lozi people, the Paramount Chief of the Lozi (Ba-rotse) for the area which later became Barotziland-North-Western Rhodesia.

To the east, in December 1897 a group of the Angoni or Ngoni (originally from Zululand) rebelled under Tsinco, son of King Mpezeni, but the rebellion was put down, and Mpezeni accepted the Pax Britannica. That part of the country then came to be known as North-Eastern Rhodesia. In 1895, Rhodes asked his American scout Frederick Russell Burnham to look for minerals and ways to improve river navigation in the region, and it was during this trek that Burnham discovered major copper deposits along the Kafue River.

North-Eastern Rhodesia and Barotziland-North-Western Rhodesia were administered as separate units until 1911 when they were merged to form Northern Rhodesia, a British protectorate. In 1923, the BSA Company ceded control of Northern Rhodesia to the British Government after the government decided not to renew the company's charter.

British colonisation

In 1923, Southern Rhodesia (now Zimbabwe), a conquered territory which was also administered by the BSA Company, became a self-governing British colony. In 1924, after negotiations, the administration of Northern Rhodesia transferred to the British Colonial Office.

Federation of Rhodesia and Nyasaland
In 1953, the creation of the Federation of Rhodesia and Nyasaland grouped together Northern Rhodesia, Southern Rhodesia, and Nyasaland (now Malawi) as a single semi-autonomous region. This was undertaken despite opposition from a sizeable minority of the population, who demonstrated against it in 1960–61. Northern Rhodesia was the center of much of the turmoil and crisis characterizing the federation in its last years. Initially, Harry Nkumbula's African National Congress (ANC) led the campaign, which Kenneth Kaunda's United National Independence Party (UNIP) subsequently took up.

Independence

A two-stage election held in October and December 1962 resulted in an African majority in the legislative council and an uneasy coalition between the two African nationalist parties. The council passed resolutions calling for Northern Rhodesia's secession from the federation and demanding full internal self-government under a new constitution and a new National Assembly based on a broader, more democratic franchise.

The federation was dissolved on 31 December 1963, and in January 1964, Kaunda won the only election for Prime Minister of Northern Rhodesia. The Colonial Governor, Sir Evelyn Hone, was very close to Kaunda and urged him to stand for the post. Soon after, there was an uprising in the north of the country known as the Lumpa Uprising led by Alice Lenshina – Kaunda's first internal conflict as leader of the nation.

Northern Rhodesia became the Republic of Zambia on 24 October 1964, with Kenneth Kaunda as the first president. At independence, despite its considerable mineral wealth, Zambia faced major challenges. Domestically, there were few trained and educated Zambians capable of running the government, and the economy was largely dependent on foreign expertise. This expertise was provided in part by John Willson. There were over 70,000 Europeans resident in Zambia in 1964, and they remained of disproportionate economic significance.

Post-independence 
Kaunda's endorsement of Patriotic Front guerrillas conducting raids into neighbouring (Southern) Rhodesia resulted in political tension and a militarisation of the border, leading to its closure in 1973. The Kariba hydroelectric station on the Zambezi River provided sufficient capacity to satisfy the country's requirements for electricity, despite Rhodesian management.

On 3 September 1978, a civilian airliner, Air Rhodesia Flight 825, was shot down near Kariba by the Zimbabwe People's Revolutionary Army (ZIPRA). 18 people, including children, survived the crash only for most of them to be shot by militants of the Zimbabwe African People's Union (ZAPU) led by Joshua Nkomo. Rhodesia responded with Operation Gatling, an attack on Nkomo's guerilla bases in Zambia, in particular, his military headquarters just outside Lusaka; this raid became known as the Green Leader Raid. On the same day, two more bases in Zambia were attacked using air power and elite paratroops and helicopter-borne troops.

A railway (TAZARA – Tanzania Zambia Railways) to the Tanzanian port of Dar es Salaam, completed in 1975 with Chinese assistance, reduced Zambian dependence on railway lines south to South Africa and west through an increasingly troubled Portuguese Angola. Until the completion of the railway, Zambia's major artery for imports and the critical export of copper was along the TanZam Road, running from Zambia to the port cities in Tanzania. The Tazama oil pipeline was also built from Dar es Salaam to Ndola in Zambia.

By the late 1970s, Mozambique and Angola had attained independence from Portugal. Rhodesia's predominantly white government, which issued a Unilateral Declaration of Independence in 1965, accepted majority rule under the Lancaster House Agreement in 1979.

Civil strife in both Portuguese colonies and a mounting Namibian War of Independence resulted in an influx of refugees and compounded transportation issues. The Benguela railway, which extended west through Angola, was essentially closed to Zambian traffic by the late 1970s. Zambia's support for anti-apartheid movements such as the African National Congress (ANC) also created security problems as the South African Defence Force struck at dissident targets during external raids.

Economic troubles

In the mid-1970s, the price of copper, Zambia's principal export, suffered a severe decline worldwide. In Zambia's situation, the cost of transporting the copper great distances to the market was an additional strain. Zambia turned to foreign and international lenders for relief, but, as copper prices remained depressed, it became increasingly difficult to service its growing debt. By the mid-1990s, despite limited debt relief, Zambia's per capital foreign debt remained among the highest in the world.

Democratisation

In June 1990 riots against Kaunda accelerated. Many protesters were killed by the regime in breakthrough June 1990 protests. In 1990 Kaunda survived an attempted coup, and in 1991 he agreed to reinstate multiparty democracy, having instituted one-party rule under the Choma Commission of 1972. Following multiparty elections, Kaunda was removed from office (see below).

On 30 December 1991, at a private ceremony, the newly installed president Frederick Chiluba declared Zambia as a Christian state with Christianity as its official religion.

In the 2000s, the economy stabilised, attaining single-digit inflation in 2006–2007, real GDP growth, decreasing interest rates, and increasing levels of trade. Much of its growth is due to foreign investment in mining and to higher world copper prices. All this led to Zambia being courted enthusiastically by aid donors and saw a surge in investor confidence in the country.

On 20 January 2015, following the death of Michael Sata, nominee Edgar Lungu won the presidential election with 807,625 popular votes.

Politics

Politics in Zambia take place in a framework of a presidential representative democratic republic, whereby the President of Zambia is both head of state and head of government in a pluriform multi-party system. The government exercises executive power, while legislative power is vested in both the government and parliament.

Zambia became a republic immediately upon attaining independence in October 1964. From 2011 to 2014, Zambia's president had been Michael Sata, until Sata died on 28 October 2014. After Sata's death, Vice President Guy Scott, a Zambian of Scottish descent, became acting President of Zambia. Presidential elections were held on 22 January 2015. A total number of 11 presidential candidates contested in the election and On 24 January 2015, it was announced that Edgar Chagwa Lungu had won the election to become the 6th President in a tightly contested race. He won 48.33% of the vote, a lead of 1.66 percentage points (3.56%) over his closest rival, Hakainde Hichilema, with 46.67%. Nine other candidates all got less than 1% each. In August 2016 Zambian general election president Edgar Lungu won re-election narrowly in the first round of the election. The opposition had allegations of fraud and the governing Patriotic Front (PF) rejected the allegations made by opposition UPND party.

In the 2021 general elections, characterised by a 70% voter turnout, Hakainde Hichilema won 59% of the vote, with his closest rival, incumbent president Edgar Chagwa Lungu, receiving 39% of the vote. On 16 August Edgar Lungu conceded in a TV statement, sending a letter and congratulating president-elect Hakainde Hichilema. On 24 August 2021, Hakainde Hichilema was sworn in as the new President of Zambia in a ceremony attended by many heads of states including the head of commonwealth it was held at the Heroes Stadium in the capital city Lusaka.

Foreign relations

After independence in 1964, the foreign relations of Zambia were mostly focused on supporting liberation movements in other countries in Southern Africa, such as the African National Congress and SWAPO. During the Cold War, Zambia was a member of the Non-Aligned Movement.

Military

The Zambian Defence Force (ZDF) consists of the Zambia Army (ZA), the Zambia Air Force (ZAF), and the Zambian National Service (ZNS). The ZDF is designed primarily against external threats.

In 2019, Zambia signed the UN treaty on the Prohibition of Nuclear Weapons.

Administrative divisions

Zambia is administratively divided into ten provinces subdivided into 116 districts, and electorally into 156 constituencies and 1,281 wards.

Provinces
 Central Province
 Copperbelt
 Eastern Province
 Luapula
 Lusaka
 Muchinga
 North-Western Province
 Northern Province
 Southern Province
 Western Province

Human rights

The government is sensitive to any opposition and criticism and has been quick to prosecute critics using the legal pretext that they had incited public disorder. Libel laws are used to suppress free speech and the press.

Same-sex sexual activity is illegal for both males and females in Zambia. A 2010 survey revealed that only 2% of Zambians find homosexuality to be morally acceptable.

In December 2019, it was reported that United States Ambassador to Zambia Daniel Lewis Foote was "horrified" by Zambia's jailing of same-sex couple Japhet Chataba and Steven Samba. After an appeal failed and the couple was sentenced to 15 years in prison, Foote asked the Zambian government to review both the case and the country's anti-homosexuality laws. Foote faced a backlash and canceled public appearances after he was threatened on social media, and was subsequently recalled after President Lungu declared him persona non grata.

Geography

Zambia is a landlocked country in southern Africa, with a tropical climate, and consists mostly of high plateaus with some hills and mountains, dissected by river valleys. At 290,587 sq mi it is the 38th-largest country in the world, slightly smaller than Turkey. The country lies mostly between latitudes 8° and 18°S, and longitudes 22° and 34°E.

Zambia is drained by two major river basins: the Zambezi/Kafue basin in the center, west, and south covering about three-quarters of the country; and the Congo basin in the north covering about one-quarter of the country. A very small area in the northeast forms part of the internal drainage basin of Lake Rukwa in Tanzania.

In the Zambezi basin, there are a number of major rivers flowing wholly or partially through Zambia: the Kabompo, Lungwebungu, Kafue, Luangwa, and the Zambezi itself, which flows through the country in the west and then forms its southern border with Namibia, Botswana and Zimbabwe. Its source is in Zambia but it diverts into Angola, and a number of its tributaries rise in Angola's central highlands. The edge of the Cuando River floodplain (not its main channel) forms Zambia's southwestern border, and via the Chobe River that river contributes very little water to the Zambezi because most are lost by evaporation.

Two of the Zambezi's longest and largest tributaries, the Kafue and the Luangwa, flow mainly in Zambia. Their confluences with the Zambezi are on the border with Zimbabwe at Chirundu and Luangwa town respectively. Before its confluence, the Luangwa River forms part of Zambia's border with Mozambique. From Luangwa town, the Zambezi leaves Zambia and flows into Mozambique, and eventually into the Mozambique Channel.

The Zambezi valley, running along the southern border, is both deep and wide. From Lake Kariba going east, it is formed by grabens and like the Luangwa, Mweru-Luapula, Mweru-wa-Ntipa and Lake Tanganyika valleys, is a rift valley.

The north of Zambia is very flat with broad plains. In the west the most notable being the Barotse Floodplain on the Zambezi, which floods from December to June, lagging behind the annual rainy season (typically November to April). The flood dominates the natural environment and the lives, society, and culture of the inhabitants and those of other smaller, floodplains throughout the country.

These plateau areas of northern Zambia have been categorised by the World Wildlife Fund as a large section of the Central Zambezian miombo woodlands ecoregion.

Eastern Zambia shows great diversity. The Luangwa Valley splits the plateau in a curve north-east to south-west, extended west into the heart of the plateau by the deep valley of the Lunsemfwa River. Hills and mountains are found by the side of some sections of the valley, notably in its north-east the Nyika Plateau on the Malawi border, which extend into Zambia as the Mafinga Hills, containing the country's highest point, Mafinga Central.

The Muchinga Mountains, the watershed between the Zambezi and Congo drainage basins, run parallel to the deep valley of the Luangwa River and form a sharp backdrop to its northern edge, although they are almost everywhere below . The border of the Congo Pedicle was drawn around this mountain.

The southernmost headstream of the Congo River rises in Zambia and flows west through its northern area firstly as the Chambeshi and then, after the Bangweulu Swamps as the Luapula, which forms part of the border with the Democratic Republic of the Congo. The Luapula flows south then west before it turns north until it enters Lake Mweru. The lake's other major tributary is the Kalungwishi River, which flows into it from the east. The Luvua River drains Lake Mweru, flowing out of the northern end to the Lualaba River (Upper Congo River).

Lake Tanganyika is the other major hydrographic feature that belongs to the Congo basin. Its south-eastern end receives water from the Kalambo River, which forms part of Zambia's border with Tanzania. This river has Africa's second highest uninterrupted waterfall, the Kalambo Falls.

Climate

The average elevation of  gives the land a generally moderate climate. The climate of Zambia is tropical, modified by elevation. In the Köppen climate classification, most of the country is classified as humid subtropical or tropical wet and dry, with small stretches of semi-arid steppe climate in the south-west and along the Zambezi valley.

There are two main seasons, the rainy season (November to April) corresponding to summer, and the dry season (May/June to October/November), corresponding to winter. The dry season is subdivided into the cool dry season (May/June to August), and the hot dry season (September to October/November). The modifying influence of altitude gives the country pleasant subtropical weather rather than tropical conditions during the cool season of May to August. However, average monthly temperatures remain above  over most of the country for eight or more months of the year.

Biodiversity

There are numerous ecosystems in Zambia, such as forest, thicket, woodland and grassland vegetation types.

Zambia has approximately 12,505 identified species – 63% animal species, 33% plant species and 4% bacterial species and other microorganisms.

There are an estimated 3,543 species of wild flowering plants, consisting of sedges, herbaceous plants and woody plants. The Northern and North-Western provinces of the country especially have the highest diversity of flowering plants. Approximately 53% of flowering plants are rare and occur throughout the country. Lists, descriptions, and keys of all the plant species of Zambia, as well as several of the neighboring countries, are covered in the Flora Zambesiaca project directed by the Royal Botanic Gardens, Kew.

A total of 242 mammal species are found in the country, with most occupying the woodland and grassland ecosystems. The Rhodesian giraffe and Kafue lechwe are some of the well-known subspecies that are endemic to Zambia.

An estimated 757 bird species have been seen in the country, of which 600 are either resident or Afrotropic migrants; 470 breed in the country; and 100 are non-breeding migrants. The Zambian barbet is a species endemic to Zambia.

Roughly 490 known fish species, belonging to 24 fish families, have been reported in Zambia, with Lake Tanganyika having the highest number of endemic species.

The country had a 2019 Forest Landscape Integrity Index mean score of 7.5/10, ranking it 39th globally out of 172 countries.

Demographics

As of the 2010 Zambian census, Zambia's population was 13,092,666. Zambia is racially and ethnically diverse, with 73 distinct ethnic groups. During its colonial administration by the British between 1911 and 1963, the country attracted immigrants from Europe and the Indian subcontinent, the latter of whom came as indentured workers. While most Europeans left after the collapse of white-minority rule, many Asians remained.

In the first census—conducted on 7 May 1911—there were a total of 1,497 Europeans; 39 Asiatics and an estimated 820,000 black Africans. Black Africans were not counted in the six censuses conducted in 1911, 1921, 1931, 1946, 1951 and 1956, prior to independence, but their population was estimated. By 1956, there were 65,277 Europeans, 5,450 Asiatics, and an estimated 2,100,000 black Africans.

Zambia continues to have a small population of a historically mixed race group referred to as "Coloured" or Goffal, a group made up largely of people with black African and white British heritage (at times Indian heritage). Coloureds have not been recorded on the census since Zambia gained independence in 1964 and have not enjoyed the same rights as other groups (read: Goffal).

In the 2010 population census, 99.2% were black Africans and 0.8% consisted of other racial groups.

Zambia is one of the most highly urbanised countries in sub-Saharan Africa, with 44% of the population concentrated along the major transport corridors, while rural areas are sparsely populated. The fertility rate was 6.2  (6.1 in 1996, 5.9 in 2001–02).

Largest towns

The onset of industrial copper mining on the Copperbelt in the late 1920s triggered rapid urbanisation. Although urbanisation was overestimated during the colonial period, it was substantial. Mining townships on the Copperbelt soon dwarfed existing centres of population and continued to grow rapidly following Zambian independence. Economic decline in the Copperbelt from the 1970s to the 1990s has altered patterns of urban development, but the country's population remains concentrated around the railway and roads running south from the Copperbelt through Kapiri Mposhi, Lusaka, Choma and Livingstone.

Ethnic groups

The population includes approximately 73 ethnic groups, most of which are Bantu-speaking. Almost 90% of Zambians belong to the nine main ethnolinguistic groups: the Nyanja-Chewa, Bemba, Tonga, Tumbuka, Lunda, Luvale, Kaonde, Nkoya and Lozi. In the rural areas, ethnic groups are concentrated in particular geographic regions. Many groups are small and not well known. However, all the ethnic groups can be found in significant numbers in Lusaka and the Copperbelt. In addition to the linguistic dimension, tribal identities are relevant in Zambia. These tribal identities are often linked to family allegiance or to traditional authorities. The tribal identities are nested within the main language groups.

Immigrants, mostly British or South African, as well as some white Zambian citizens of British descent, live mainly in Lusaka and in the Copperbelt in northern Zambia, where they are either employed in mines, financial and related activities or retired. There were 70,000 Europeans in Zambia in 1964, but many have since left the country.

Zambia has a small but economically important Asian population, most of whom are Indians and Chinese. This minority group has a massive impact on the economy controlling the manufacturing sector. An estimated 80,000 Chinese reside in Zambia. In recent years, several hundred dispossessed white farmers have left Zimbabwe at the invitation of the Zambian government, to take up farming in the Southern province.

Zambia has a minority of coloureds of mixed race. During colonialism, segregation separated coloureds, blacks and whites in public places including schools, hospitals, and in housing. There has been an increase in interracial relationships due to Zambia's growing economy importing labor. Coloureds are not recorded on the census but are considered a minority in Zambia.

According to the World Refugee Survey 2009 published by the U.S. Committee for Refugees and Immigrants, Zambia had a population of refugees and asylum seekers numbering approximately 88,900. The majority of refugees in the country came from the Democratic Republic of the Congo (47,300 refugees from the DRC living in Zambia in 2007), Angola (27,100; see Angolans in Zambia), Zimbabwe (5,400) and Rwanda (4,900). Zambians are generally welcoming towards foreigners.

Beginning in May 2008, the number of Zimbabweans in Zambia began to increase significantly; the influx consisted largely of Zimbabweans formerly living in South Africa who were fleeing xenophobic violence there. Nearly 60,000 refugees live in camps in Zambia, while 50,000 are mixed in with the local populations. Refugees who wish to work in Zambia must apply for permits, which can cost up to $500 per year.

Religion

Zambia is officially a "Christian nation" under the 1996 constitution, but recognizes and protects freedom of religion. While fewer than three percent of the population still observe indigenous faiths, Zambian Christianity is highly syncretic, and many self-identified Christians blend elements of traditional African religion with their faith.

About three-fourths of the population adheres to one of several Protestant denominations, including Anglicanism, New Apostolic Church, Lutheranism, Jehovah's Witnesses, the Seventh-day Adventist Church, and the Church of Jesus Christ of Latter-day Saints; many Zambians also observe broader, nondenominational Christian movements, such as Branhamism, Pentecostalism, and Evangelical denominations. Roughly one-fifth are Roman Catholic.

Christianity arrived to Zambia through missionary work in the second half of the 19th century, and its wide variety of sects and movements reflect changing patterns of missionary activity; for example, Catholicism came from Portuguese Mozambique in the east, while Anglicanism reflects British influences from the south. Following its independence in 1964, Zambia saw a greater influx of other church missions from across the world, particularly North America and Germany. In subsequent decades, Western missionary roles have been assumed by native believers (except for some technical positions, such as physicians). After Frederick Chiluba, a Pentecostal Christian, became president in 1991, Pentecostal congregations expanded considerably around the country.

A large number of otherwise smaller Christian denominations are disproportionately represented in Zambia. The country has one of the world's largest communities of Seventh-day Adventists on a per-capita basis, accounting for about 1 in 18 Zambians. The Lutheran Church of Central Africa has over 11,000 members in the country. Counting only active preachers, Jehovah's Witnesses, who have been present in Zambia since 1911, have over 190,000 adherents; nearly 800,000 attended the annual observance of Christ's death in 2021. About 12 percent of Zambians are members of the New Apostolic Church; with more than 1.2 million believers, the country has the third-largest community in Africa, out of a total worldwide membership of over 9 million.

Not including indigenous beliefs, non-Christian faiths total less than three percent of the population, though are nonetheless highly visible, particularly in urban areas. Followers of the Baháʼí Faith number over 160,000, or 1.5 percent of the population, which is among the largest communities in the world; the William Mmutle Masetlha Foundation, run by the Baháʼí community, is particularly active in areas such as literacy and primary health care. Approximately 0.5 percent of Zambians are Muslim, and a similar proportion are Hindu, in each case highly concentrated in urban areas. About 500 people belong to the Ahmadiyya community, which is variably considered an Islamic movement or a heretical sect. There is also a small but successful Jewish community, composed mostly of Ashkenazis.

Languages

The exact number of Zambian languages is unknown, although many texts claim that Zambia has 73 languages and/or dialects; this figure is probably due to a non-distinction between language and dialect, based on the criterion of mutual intelligibility. On this basis, the number of Zambian languages would probably be only about 20 or 30.

The official language of Zambia is English, which is used for official business and public education. The main local language, especially in Lusaka, is Nyanja (Chewa), followed by Bemba. In the Copperbelt, Bemba is the main language and Nyanja second. Bemba and Nyanja are spoken in the urban areas, in addition to other indigenous languages that are commonly spoken in Zambia. These include Lozi, Tumbuka, Kaonde, Tonga, Lunda and Luvale, which featured on the Zambia National Broadcasting Corporation (ZNBC) local-languages section.

Urbanisation has had a dramatic effect on some of the indigenous languages, including the assimilation of words from other languages. Urban dwellers sometimes differentiate between urban and rural dialects of the same language by prefixing the rural languages with 'deep'.

Most will thus speak Bemba and Nyanja in the Copperbelt; Nyanja is dominantly spoken in Lusaka and Eastern Zambia. English is used in official communications and is the language of choice at home among – now common – interethnic families. This evolution of languages has led to Zambian slang heard throughout Lusaka and other major cities. The majority of Zambians usually speak more than one language: the official language, English, and the most spoken language in the town or area they live in. Portuguese has been introduced as a second language into the school curriculum due to the presence of a large Portuguese-speaking Angolan community. French is commonly studied in private schools, while some secondary schools have it as an optional subject. A German course has been introduced at the University of Zambia (UNZA).

Education

The right to equal and adequate education for all is enshrined within the Zambian constitution. The Education Act of 2011 regulates equal and quality education. The Ministry of General Education effectively oversees the provision of quality education through policy and regulation of the education curriculum.

Fundamentally, the aim of education in Zambia is to promote the full and well-rounded development of the physical, intellectual, social, affective, moral, and spiritual qualities of all learners. The education system has three core structures: Early childhood education and primary education (Grades 1–7), secondary education (Grades 8–12), and tertiary education. Adult-literacy programs are available for semi-literate and illiterate individuals.

The government's annual expenditure on education has increased over the years, from 16.1 percent in 2006 to 20.2 percent in 2015.

Health

Zambia is experiencing a generalised HIV/AIDS epidemic, with a national HIV prevalence rate of 12.10 percent among adults. However, the country has made progress over the past decade: The prevalence rate of HIV/AIDS for adults aged 15–49 decreased to 13 percent in 2013/14, compared to 16 percent roughly a decade earlier. Other health outcomes have also improved significantly, despite remaining poor by global standards. The maternal mortality rate in 2014 was 398 per 100,000 live births, compared to 591 in 2007; over the same period, the mortality rate of children under five dropped to 75 from 119 per 1,000 live births.

Economy

Presently, Zambia averages between $7.5 billion and $8 billion of exports annually. It totaled $9.1 billion worth of exports in 2018.  In  2015, about 54.4% of Zambians lived below the recognised national poverty line, improved from 60.5% in 2010.  Rural poverty rates were about 76.6% and urban rates at about 23.4%.  The national poverty line was ZMK 214 (US$12.85) per month.  Unemployment and underemployment in urban areas are serious problems.  Most rural Zambians are subsistence farmers.

Zambia ranked 117th out of 128 countries on the 2007 Global Competitiveness Index, which looks at factors that affect economic growth. In the same index in 2019 however Zambia slipped in ranking to 19th place in Africa and 120th globally. Social indicators continue to decline, particularly in measurements of life expectancy at birth (about 40.9 years) and maternal mortality (830 per 100,000 pregnancies).

Zambia fell into poverty after international copper prices declined in the 1970s. The socialist regime made up for falling revenue with several abortive attempts at International Monetary Fund structural adjustment programs (SAPs). The policy of not trading through the main supply route and line of rail to the sea – the territory was known as Rhodesia (from 1965 to 1979), and now known as Zimbabwe – cost the economy greatly. After the Kaunda regime, (from 1991) successive governments began limited reforms. The economy stagnated until the late 1990s. In 2007 Zambia recorded its ninth consecutive year of economic growth. Inflation was 8.9%, down from 30% in 2000.

Zambia is still dealing with economic reform issues such as the size of the public sector, and improving Zambia's social sector delivery systems. Economic regulations and red tape are extensive, and corruption is widespread. The bureaucratic procedures surrounding the process of obtaining licences encourages the widespread use of facilitation payments. Zambia's total foreign debt exceeded $6 billion when the country qualified for Highly Indebted Poor Country Initiative (HIPC) debt relief in 2000, contingent upon meeting certain performance criteria. Initially, Zambia hoped to reach the HIPC completion point, and benefit from substantial debt forgiveness, in late 2003.

In January 2003, the Zambian government informed the International Monetary Fund and World Bank that it wished to renegotiate some of the agreed performance criteria calling for privatisation of the Zambia National Commercial Bank and the national telephone and electricity utilities. Although agreements were reached on these issues, subsequent overspending on civil service wages delayed Zambia's final HIPC debt forgiveness from late 2003 to early 2005, at the earliest. In an effort to reach HIPC completion in 2004, the government drafted an austerity budget for 2004, freezing civil service salaries and increasing the number of taxes. The tax hike and public sector wage freeze prohibited salary increases and new hires. This sparked a nationwide strike in February 2004.

The Zambian government is pursuing an economic diversification program to reduce the economy's reliance on the copper industry. This initiative seeks to exploit other components of Zambia's rich resource base by promoting agriculture, tourism, gemstone mining, and hydro-power. In July 2018, Turkish President Recep Tayyip Erdogan and Zambia's President Edgar Lungu signed 12 agreements in capital Lusaka on areas ranging from trade and investment to tourism and diplomacy.

Mining

The Zambian economy has historically been based on the copper mining industry. The output of copper had fallen to a low of 228,000 metric tons in 1998 after a 30-year decline in output due to lack of investment, low copper prices, and uncertainty over privatisation. In 2002, following the privatisation of the industry, copper production rebounded to 337,000 metric tons. Improvements in the world copper market have magnified the effect of this volume increase on revenues and foreign exchange earnings.

In 2003, exports of nonmetals increased by 25% and accounted for 38% of all export earnings, previously 35%. The Zambian government has recently been granting licenses to international resource companies to prospect for minerals such as nickel, tin, copper, and uranium. The government of Zambia hopes that nickel will take over from copper as the country's top metallic export. In 2009, Zambia was badly hit by the world economic crisis.

Agriculture

Agriculture plays a very important part in Zambia's economy providing many more jobs than the mining industry.
A small number of white Zimbabwean farmers were welcomed into Zambia after their expulsion by Robert Mugabe, whose numbers had reached roughly 150 to 300 people . They farm a variety of crops including tobacco, wheat, and chili peppers on an estimated 150 farms. The skills they brought, combined with general economic liberalisation under the late Zambian president Levy Mwanawasa, has been credited with stimulating an agricultural boom in Zambia. In 2004, for the first time in 26 years, Zambia exported more corn than it imported. In December 2019, the Zambian government unanimously decided to legalize cannabis for medicinal and export purposes only.

Energy

In 2009, Zambia generated 10.3 TWh of electricity and has been rated high in use of both solar power and hydroelectricity. However, Zambia began experiencing a serious energy shortage due to the poor 2014/2015 rain season, which resulted in low water levels at the Kariba dam and other major dams. In September 2019, African Green Resources (AGR) announced that it would invest $150 million in a 50 megawatt (MW) solar farm, along with an irrigation dam and expanding the existing grain silo capacity by 80,000 tonnes.

Culture

Prior to the establishment of modern Zambia, the inhabitants lived in independent tribes, each with its own way of life. One of the results of the colonial era was the growth of urbanisation. Different ethnic groups started living together in towns and cities, influencing each other's way of life. They also started adopting aspects of global or universal culture, especially in terms of dressing and mannerisms. Much of the original cultures of Zambia have largely survived in rural areas, with some outside influences such as Christianity. Cultures that are specific to certain ethnic groups within Zambia are known as 'Zambian cultures' while those lifestyles that are common across ethnic groups are labelled "Zambian culture" because they are practiced by almost every Zambian. In the urban setting, there is a continuous integration and evolution of these cultures to produce what is called "Zambian culture".

Zambia practices several ceremonies and rituals ranging from nationally recognised traditional ceremonies to unrecognised yet important ceremonies. Many of the ceremonies and rituals are performed on special occasions celebrating or marking achievements, anniversaries, the passage of time, coronations and presidential occasions, atonement and purification, graduation, dedication, oaths of allegiance, initiation, marriage, funeral, birth ceremonies and others.

Like most African countries, Zambia practices both disclosed and undisclosed ceremonies and rituals. Among the disclosed ceremonies and rituals include calendrical or seasonal, contingent, affliction, divination, initiation and regular or daily ceremonies. Undisclosed ceremonies include those practiced in secret such by spiritual groups like Nyau and Nakisha dancers and traditional marriage counsellors such as alangizi women. As of December 2016, Zambia had 77 calendrical or seasonal traditional ceremonies recognized by government, and this number will increase in the near future. The ceremonies once a year include Nc’wala, Kulonga, Kuoboka, Malaila, Nsengele, Chibwela kumushi, Dantho, Ntongo, Makundu, Lwiindi, Chuungu, and Lyenya. These are known as Zambian traditional ceremonies. Some of the more prominent are: Kuomboka and Kathanga (Western Province), Mutomboko (Luapula Province), Kulamba and Ncwala (Eastern Province), Lwiindi and Shimunenga (Southern Province), Lunda Lubanza (North Western), Likumbi Lyamize (North Western), Mbunda Lukwakwa (North Western Province), Chibwela Kumushi (Central Province), Vinkhakanimba (Muchinga Province), Ukusefya Pa Ng'wena (Northern Province).

Popular traditional arts include pottery, basketry (such as Tonga baskets), stools, fabrics, mats, wooden carvings, ivory carvings, wire craft, and copper crafts. Most Zambian traditional music is based on drums (and other percussion instruments) with a lot of singing and dancing. In urban areas, foreign genres of music are popular, particularly Congolese rumba, African-American music and Jamaican reggae.

Media

The Ministry of Information and Broadcasting Services in Zambia is responsible for the Zambian News Agency, while there are also numerous media outlets throughout the country which include; television stations, newspapers, FM radio stations, and Internet news websites.

Sports and games
Sports and games are common social aspects of Zambian culture(s) that brings people together for learning, development of skills, fun and joyous moments. Sports and games in Zambia include, but are not limited to, football, athletics, netball, volleyball and indigenous games such as nsolo, chiyenga, waida, hide and seek, walyako, and sojo. These are some of the indigenous games that support socialisation. All these sports and games are part of the Zambian culture(s). The fact that the games are played by more than one person makes them social and edutainment events. The history of some of these games is as old as Zambians themselves. However, Zambia started taking part in popular global sports and games mainly in the 1964 Summer Olympics. 

Zambia declared its independence on the day of the closing ceremony of the 1964 Summer Olympics, thereby becoming the first country ever to have entered an Olympic game as one country, and leave it as another. In 2016, Zambia participated for the thirteenth time in the Olympic games. Two medals were won. The medals were won successively in boxing and in track. In 1984 Keith Mwila won a bronze medal in the light flyweight. In 1996 Samuel Matete won a silver medal in the 400-metre hurdles. Zambia has never participated in the Winter Olympics.

Football is the most popular sport in Zambia, and the Zambia national football team has had its triumphant moments in football history. At the Seoul Olympics in 1988, the national team defeated the Italian national team with a score of 4–0. Kalusha Bwalya, Zambia's most celebrated football player, and one of Africa's greatest football players in history scored a hat trick in that match. However, to this day, many pundits say the greatest team Zambia has ever assembled was the one that perished on 28 April 1993 in a plane crash at Libreville, Gabon. Despite this, in 1996, Zambia was ranked 15th on the official FIFA World Football Team rankings, the highest attained by any southern African team. In 2012, Zambia won the African Cup of Nations for the first time after losing in the final twice. They beat Côte d'Ivoire 8–7 in a penalty shoot-out in the final, which was played in Libreville, just a few kilometers away from the plane crash 19 years previously. In 2017, Zambia hosted and won the Pan-African football tournament U-20 African Cup of Nation for players age 20 and under.

The Zambia women's national football team, meanwhile, achieved a triumphant moment as the first national team from a landlocked country in Africa to qualify for the FIFA Women's World Cup, by virtually finishing third in the 2022 Women's Africa Cup of Nations. It's also the country's first ever senior World Cup in the history.

Rugby Union, boxing and cricket are also popular sports in Zambia. Notably, at one point in the early 2000s, the Australia and South Africa national rugby teams were captained by players born in the same Lusaka hospital, those players being George Gregan and Corné Krige, respectively. Until 2014, the Roan Antelope Rugby Club in Luanshya held the Guinness World Record for the tallest rugby union goal posts in the world at 110 ft, 6 inches high. This world record is now held by the Wednesbury Rugby Club.

Rugby union in Zambia is a minor but growing sport. They are currently ranked 73rd by the IRB and have 3,650 registered players and three formally organised clubs. Zambia used to play cricket as part of Rhodesia. Zambia has also provided a shinty international, Zambian-born Eddie Tembo representing Scotland in the compromise rules Shinty/Hurling game against Ireland in 2008.

In 2011, Zambia was due to host the tenth All-Africa Games, for which three stadiums were to be built in Lusaka, Ndola, and Livingstone. The Lusaka stadium would have a capacity of 70,000 spectators while the other two stadiums would hold 50,000 people each. The government was encouraging the private sector to get involved in the construction of the sports facilities because of a shortage of public funds for the project. Zambia later withdrew its bid to host the 2011 All-Africa Games, citing a lack of funds. Hence, Mozambique took Zambia's place as host.

Zambia also produced the first black African (Madalitso Muthiya) to play in the United States Golf Open, one of the four major golf tournaments.

In 1989, the country's basketball team had its best performance when it qualified for the FIBA Africa Championship and thus finished as one of Africa's top ten teams.

Music and dance
Zambia's culture has been an integral part of their development post-independence such as the uprising of cultural villages and private museums. The music which introduced dance is part of their cultural expression and it embodies the beauty and spectacle of life in Zambia, from the intricacies of the talking drums to the Kamangu drum used to announce the beginning of Malaila traditional ceremony. Dance as a practice serves as a unifying factor bringing the people together as one.

Zamrock
Zamrock is a musical genre that emerged in the 1970s, and has developed a cult following in the West. Zamrock has been described as mixing traditional Zambian music with heavy repetitive riffs similar to groups, musicians and singers such as Jimi Hendrix, James Brown, Black Sabbath, Rolling Stones, Deep Purple, and Cream. Notable groups in the genre include Rikki Ililonga and his band Musi-O-Tunya, WITCH, Chrissy "Zebby" Tembo, and Paul Ngozi and his Ngozi Family.

Notable people

See also

 Index of Zambia-related articles
 Outline of Zambia

References

Further reading

 DeRoche, Andy, Kenneth Kaunda, the United States and Southern Africa (London: Bloomsbury, 2016)
 
 Gewald, J. B., et al. One Zambia, Many Histories: Towards a History of Post-colonial Zambia (Brill, 2008)
 Ihonvbere, Julius, Economic Crisis, Civil Society and Democratisation: The Case of Zambia (Africa Research & Publications, 1996)
 LaMonica, Christopher, Local Government Matters: The Case of Zambia  (Lambert Academic Publishing, 2010)
 Mcintyre, Charles, Zambia, (Bradt Travel Guides, 2008)
 Murphy, Alan and Luckham, Nana, Zambia and Malawi, Lonely Planet Multi Country Guide (Lonely Planet Publications, 2010)
 Phiri, Bizeck Jube, A Political History of Zambia: From the Colonial Period to the 3rd Republic (Africa Research & Publications, 2005)
 Roberts, Andrew, A History of Zambia (Heinemann, 1976)
 Sardanis, Andrew, Africa: Another Side of the Coin: Northern Rhodesia's Final Years and Zambia's Nationhood (I. B. Tauris, 2003)

External links

 Official government website 
 Zambia. The World Factbook. Central Intelligence Agency.
 Zambia Corruption Profile from the Business Anti-Corruption Portal
 
 Zambia profile from BBC News
 
 Key Development Forecasts for Zambia from International Futures
 World Bank Summary Trade Statistics Zambia
 First early human fossil found in Africa makes debut

 
East African countries
Southeast African countries
Southern African countries
Republics in the Commonwealth of Nations
English-speaking countries and territories
Landlocked countries
Least developed countries
Member states of the African Union
Member states of the Commonwealth of Nations
Member states of the United Nations
States and territories established in 1964
1964 establishments in Zambia
Countries in Africa
Christian states